Kim Hee-ae (born April 23, 1967) is a South Korean actress. She is best known for her leading roles in Korean dramas such as Sons and Daughters (1992), Perfect Love (2003), My Husband's Woman (2007), How Long I've Kissed (2012), Secret Affair (2014), and The World of the Married (2020). She has received multiple acting awards including two Daesang (Grand Prize) and four Best Actress Awards for Television at the Baeksang Arts Awards. In 2020, she was selected as Gallup Korea's Television Actor of the Year.

Early life
Kim Hee-ae was born in Jeju City, and her family later moved to Seoul.

Kim was a freshman at Hyehwa Girls' High School when she was discovered by the younger brother of one of her teachers; he had been visiting the school by chance and worked for an advertising agency. This led to her first modeling job in a commercial for a school uniform brand in 1982.
This was actually her debut activity.

Career

1983–2003: Acting debut and stardom
In 1983, Kim made her acting debut in the film The First Day of the Twentieth Year. While studying at Chung-Ang University as a Theater and Film major, she appeared in her first television drama on KBS in 1986. Over the next decade, she would go on to have a successful career on Korean television, alongside fellow top actresses Chae Shi-ra and Choi Jin-sil. Among her most significant dramas during this period were Beyond the Mountains (1991) and Sons and Daughters (1992), for which she won the highest award at the MBC Drama Awards and the Baeksang Arts Awards, called the Daesang ("Grand Prize").

2003–2009: Hit dramas
She again drew praise in 2003 for two consecutive hit dramas. In Wife, her husband vanishes and reappears years later as an amnesiac with another family, while in Perfect Love (written by Kim Soo-hyun), her role as the perfect wife and mother who gets diagnosed with a terminal illness earned her another Daesang from the Baeksang Arts Awards. She worked again with Kim a year later in Precious Family (also known as Letters to My Parents), playing a woman who marries into a rich family who treats her badly after she gives birth to a baby with autism. Kim next starred in the melodrama Snow Flower.

Her third collaboration with Kim Soo-hyun was 2007's My Husband's Woman, but unlike her previous saintly characters, this time she was cast against type as a sexy, worldly woman having an affair with her best friend's husband. The adultery drama was a hit with a peak viewership rating of 38.7%, and Kim yet again won the Daesang at the Korea Drama Awards and the SBS Drama Awards.

2010–2012: Hiatus and focus on commercials and magazines
Afterwards Kim went on a brief hiatus, during which she continued to appear in commercials and magazines, gaining a reputation as a style icon for Korean middle-aged women (called "ajumma") by inspiring them to wear younger and edgier clothes. Kim returned to acting four years later with Midas, in the role of a wealthy chaebol heiress who fosters greed and ambition in a young lawyer. She then won Best Actress at the Baeksang Arts Awards for her portrayal of a housewife increasingly stifled by her husband's obsession with status who finds herself falling for her son's dentist in How Long I've Kissed, one of the inaugural dramas in 2012 of new cable channel jTBC.

2013–present: Return to the big screen and continued success
2013 marked Kim's first regular appearance in a reality show with Sisters Over Flowers, in which she, Youn Yuh-jung, Kim Ja-ok, Lee Mi-yeon and Lee Seung-gi go on a backpacker tourism trip around Croatia and Turkey.

In 2014, Kim returned to the big screen after a 21-year absence in Thread of Lies, a film adaptation of Kim Ryeo-ryeong's novel Elegant Lies about teen bullying which leads to a young girl's suicide. Kim said she accepted the project because the script was "faultless" and she felt empathy for the characters, and one review described her performance as "excellent as the grieving mother [...] understated but somehow believable, touching and honest."

Shortly after, Kim reunited with the writer and director of How Long I've Kissed in Secret Affair, about an art foundation director who embarks on a passionate affair with a poor but talented pianist 20 years her junior.

She next played the muse of real-life folk music group Twin Folio in the 2015 film C'est Si Bon, named after a music lounge located in Myeong-dong which was famous in the 1970s and 1980s for its live performances. She returned to the small screen with the police procedural drama Mrs. Cop, playing a violent crime detective who struggles to become a good mother.

In 2016, Kim signed with YG Entertainment. The same year, she starred in the family melodrama Second to Last Love.

Kim then returned to the big screen, starring in the psychological thriller The Vanished and drama film Herstory, based on the real story of comfort women. In 2019 she starred in Lim Dae-hyung's film Moonlit Winter.

In 2020, Kim made a comeback in television after four years in smash-hit drama The World of the Married, a remake of the British television series Doctor Foster. The drama series is the highest-rated Korean drama in cable television history. Kim received critical appreciation for her acting performance as Ji Sun-woo in the series.

Personal life
Kim married Lee Chan-jin, CEO of the web portal DreamWiz, in 1996. They have two sons.

Kim is a Roman Catholic and was one of 30 Catholic celebrities who appeared in the 2014 music video for the digital single "Koinonia" to commemorate Pope Francis's visit to South Korea, the first time in 19 years that the pope visited Asia.

Filmography

Film

Television

Web series

Television show

Radio program

Awards and nominations

State honors

Listicles

Notes

References

External links

 
 
 
 

1967 births
20th-century South Korean actresses
21st-century South Korean actresses
South Korean television actresses
South Korean film actresses
Chung-Ang University alumni
Living people
YG Entertainment artists
South Korean Roman Catholics
People from Jeju Province
Best Actress Paeksang Arts Award (television) winners